This is a list of sister cities in the United States state of Illinois. Sister cities, known in Europe as town twins, are cities which partner with each other to promote human contact and cultural links, although this partnering is not limited to cities and often includes counties, regions, states and other sub-national entities.

Many Illinois jurisdictions work with foreign cities through Sister Cities International, an organization whose goal is to "promote peace through mutual respect, understanding, and cooperation."

B
Bartlett	
 Miaoli, Taiwan

Belleville
 Paderborn, Germany

Belvidere

 Schwieberdingen, Germany
 Vaux-le-Pénil, France

Bensenville
 Zihuatanejo de Azueta, Mexico

Bloomington

 Asahikawa, Japan
 Caibarién, Cuba
 Canterbury, England, United Kingdom
 Remedios, Cuba
 Vladimir, Russia

Bolingbrook

 Brazzaville, Congo
 San Pablo, Philippines
 Sialkot, Pakistan
 Xuchang, China

C
Carbondale

 Shimla, India
 Tainai, Japan
 Tainan, Taiwan

Chicago

 Accra, Ghana
 Amman, Jordan
 Athens, Greece
 Belgrade, Serbia
 Birmingham, England, United Kingdom
 Bogotá, Colombia
 Busan, South Korea
 Casablanca, Morocco
 Delhi, India
 Durban, South Africa
 Galway, Ireland
 Gothenburg, Sweden
 Hamburg, Germany
 Kyiv, Ukraine
 Lahore, Pakistan
 Lucerne, Switzerland
 Mexico City, Mexico
 Milan, Italy

 Osaka, Japan

 Petah Tikva, Israel
 Prague, Czech Republic
 Shanghai, China
 Shenyang, China

 Toronto, Canada
 Vilnius, Lithuania
 Warsaw, Poland

Chicago Heights

 Asuogyaman District, Ghana
 Cedral, Mexico
 San Benedetto del Tronto, Italy
 Wadowice, Poland

Columbia
 Gedern, Germany

Crystal Lake
 Holzgerlingen, Germany

D
Decatur

 Seevetal, Germany
 Tokorozawa, Japan

Des Plaines
 Nailuva, Fiji

Dixon

 Castlebar, Ireland
 Dikson, Russia
 Herzberg, Germany
 Thika, Kenya

E
Elgin
 Vientiane, Laos

Elk Grove Village
 Termini Imerese, Italy

Evanston

 Belize City, Belize
 Dniprovskyi (Kyiv), Ukraine

F
Franklin Park

 Skarżysko-Kamienna, Poland
 Victoria de Durango, Mexico

G
Galesburg
 Ma'anshan, China

Galva
 Gävle, Sweden

Glen Ellyn

 Le Bouscat, France
 Calatayud, Spain

H
Hanover Park

 Cape Coast, Ghana
 Valparaíso, Mexico

Highland
 Sursee, Switzerland

Highland Park

 Ferrara, Italy
 Modena, Italy
 Puerto Vallarta, Mexico
 Yeruham, Israel

Hoffman Estates
 Angoulême, France

L
Lake Zurich
 Nittenau, Germany

Lockport
 Asiago, Italy

M
Millstadt
 Groß-Bieberau, Germany

Mount Prospect
 Sèvres, France

N
Naperville

 Benito Juárez, Mexico
 Nitra, Slovakia
 Pátzcuaro, Mexico

Niles

 Leixlip, Ireland
 Limanowa, Poland
 Nafplio, Greece
 Pisa, Italy

Normal

 Asahikawa, Japan
 Caibarién, Cuba
 Canterbury, England, United Kingdom
 Remedios, Cuba
 Vladimir, Russia

Northbrook
 Diegem (Machelen), Belgium

P
Palatine
 Fontenay-le-Comte, France

Park Ridge
 Kinver, England, United Kingdom

Peoria
 Friedrichshafen, Germany

Q
Quincy
 Herford (district), Germany

R
Richton Park
 Cat Island, Bahamas

Rockford

 Borgholm, Sweden
 Brovary, Ukraine
 Changzhou, China
 Cluj-Napoca, Romania
 Ferentino, Italy
 Taszár, Hungary
 Tokmok, Kyrgyzstan

Rolling Meadows
 Hénin-Beaumont, France

Roselle
 Bochnia, Poland

S
Schaumburg

 Namerikawa, Japan
 Schaumburg (district), Germany

Springfield

 Ashikaga, Japan
 Jining, China
 San Pedro, Mexico

Sterling
 Canoinhas, Brazil

Stone Park
 Ocotlán, Mexico

T
Tinley Park
 Büdingen, Germany

U
Urbana

 Haizhu (Guangzhou), China
 Thionville, France
 Zomba, Malawi

W
Waterloo
 Porta Westfalica, Germany

Waukegan
 Miyazaki, Japan

West Chicago
 Taufkirchen, Germany

West Dundee
 Dundee, Scotland, United Kingdom

Western Springs
 Cannock Chase, England, United Kingdom 

Westmont
 Hsinchu County, Taiwan

Wheaton

 Karlskoga, Sweden
 Wheaton Aston, England, United Kingdom

Wood Dale
 Cefalù, Italy

Woodstock

 Guadalupe, Mexico
 Zacatecas, Mexico

References

Illinois
Illinois geography-related lists
Populated places in Illinois
Cities in Illinois